This is a list of video game franchises that have sold or shipped at least twenty million copies. Unless otherwise stated, numbers indicate worldwide units sold, ordered alphabetically whenever two or more list the same amount. The exception are the ones specifying shipments, which have lower precedence than others listing sales.

Franchise sales include expansion packs even though they are not considered full video games. Free-to-play game downloads (including free mobile games) and microtransactions should not figure into sales or shipment figures. For video game franchises that have generated the highest overall media revenue (from games and other media and merchandise), see the list of highest-grossing media franchises.

For best-selling individual video games, see the list of best-selling video games. The sales figures given below also do not include arcade video game sales, which can be found at the list of highest-grossing arcade games. For mobile games that have generated the most revenue, see the list of highest-grossing mobile games.

At least 200 million copies
 – This color indicates a sub-series of a larger video game franchise. This does not necessarily apply for franchises that are not video game-based.

At least 100 million copies

At least 50 million copies

At least 20 million copies

See also
 List of longest-running video game franchises

Notes

Footnotes

References

Best-selling video game
Franchises